Giannis Pechlivanis (born 1 May 1988) is a Greek football midfielder who plays for Makedonikos.

Career
Born in Thessaloniki, Pechlivanis began his football career with local side PAOK, but would only make five Greek Superleague appearance for the club. After leaving PAOK, he had a few brief spells with clubs playing in the second and third levels of Greek football.

External links
Profile at epae.org
Guardian's Stats Centre
Profile at Onsports.gr
Profile at myplayer

1988 births
Living people
Greek footballers
PAOK FC players
Panetolikos F.C. players
Association football midfielders
Footballers from Thessaloniki